Gerard Granollers and Guillermo Olaso were the defending champions but chose not to defend their title.

Ruben Bemelmans and Daniel Masur won the title after defeating Jamie Murray and John-Patrick Smith 4–6, 6–3, [10–8] in the final.

Seeds

Draw

References

 Main draw

Murray Trophy - Glasgow - Doubles
2019 Doubles